Ng Gim Choo is the Founder and Chairwoman of EtonHouse International Education Group. Before setting up The EtonHouse Group, she was an auditor at Ernst and Young. When Ng was living in the UK, she was inspired by her experience as a parent of inquiry-based preschools in London, where she saw how happy, engaged and stimulated her children were at school. Motivated to bring quality education that emphasises learning through play and inquiry to Singapore, Ng ventured into the education sector and started the first EtonHouse school at Broadrick Road in 1995. Since then, EtonHouse has evolved into an international education group that offers primary, secondary and high school programmes. Today, EtonHouse has 130 schools spread across 11 countries. Together these schools provide high-quality education to over 20,000 children globally. 

Apart from being a successful businesswomen, Ng is a philanthropist. She actively uses her influence to advocate and support children in the community through EtonHouse Community Fund, a charity she champions, and inspires others with her unrelenting passion for making learning fun and enjoyable.

Awards and recognition
Ng was awarded the Woman of Benevolence (ai xin shi zhe) by Suzhou City in China in March 2004 for her significant contributions towards helping the community and promoting cultural practices. In recognition of her work and contribution towards raising the standards of international education in Singapore, Ng was the first Singaporean woman to be awarded the Freedom of the City of London in 2009.  Ng was nominated by two former Mayors of London, Sir David Brewer and Sir Clive Martin. In September 2011, she received the Jiangsu Friendship Award. In 2013, she received the 'Foreign Friend' award from the Mayor of Yiwu in China. In 2019, she won the Ernst & Young Entrepreneur Of The Year Award in the Education category. In 2021, she is one of three Singaporean women to be featured in Forbes 2021 Asia’s Power Businesswomen List. Ng was also named as Her World's Women of the Year 2022 and Tatler Asia’s Most Influential 2022. In 2023, she is featured in the Forbes 50 over 50 list.

References

External links
 EtonHouse
 INSEAD Knowledge Episode 707 (2010), "A passion for education: Ng Gim Choo, founder, EtonHouse".
  RTHK 1-2-3 Show (15 April 2014), "Ng Gim Choo - EtonHouse / Reenita Malhorta Hora - Asian Threads"

Living people
Singaporean educators
20th-century Singaporean educators
21st-century Singaporean educators
Year of birth missing (living people)